The Orion V was a line of rigid high-floor transit buses available in 32', 35', and 40' lengths manufactured by Ontario Bus Industries (renamed Orion Bus Industries in 1995) between 1989 and 2009. The conventionally powered buses, either with longitudinally mounted diesel or natural gas engines, used a T-drive transmission coupling. The Orion V replaced the Orion I, and was in turn replaced by the low-floor Orion VI (introduced in 1993) and Orion VII (introduced in 2001).

Design
The two-piece windshield of the Orion V has the driver's windshield canted towards the back of the bus to reduce reflections. The bus was available in both transit (two-door) and suburban (single front door) configurations.

All buses, regardless of fuel type, use longitudinally mounted engines with a T-drive transmission coupling driving the rear axle.

Diesel buses were offered with  fuel tanks.

Ontario (later Orion) Bus Industries (OBI) marketed the Orion V to both the Canadian and United States transit markets. Canadian buses were assembled at the OBI plant in Mississauga, Ontario. For the US market, to meet 'Buy America' requirements for federally subsidized transit vehicles, the Orion V was assembled by wholly owned subsidiary Bus Industries of America (BIA) in Oriskany, New York.

Models 
Internally, OBI designated the bus model as 05.50x, with x designating the model number.

Hybrid prototypes 
A series hybrid bus was developed by the New York State Consortium using an Orion V 40' chassis equipped with powertrain components supplied by General Electric. This hybrid bus prototype used tandem rear axles driven by four traction motors, one for each wheel. Electric traction power was generated by a Cummins B5.9 diesel engine rated at  driving a  alternator, and energy from regenerative braking was stored in nickel-cadmium batteries.

Deployment
The Orion V was OBI's most popular transit bus. The first production bus was sold to Mississauga Transit. Major transit agency users included New York City (MTA), Toronto (TTC), and Washington, D.C. (WMATA). For MTA, some buses in the final order from 1999 were unreliable and plagued with significant structural corrosion. Coast Mountain Bus Company in Vancouver operates the Orion V Suburban models built in 2008, the last buses built for a Canadian agency. The last Orion V models were built for Sonoma County Transit in 2008.

TTC retired its Orion V fleet in December 2015; the retirement event featured a final 40-minute ride on No. 9411.

Bee-Line Bus System and Sonoma County Transit operates the last Orion V buses in diesel and CNG configurations.

Competition
 Flxible Metro
 Gillig Phantom
 NABI 416
 New Flyer High Floor
 Rapid Transit Series

References

External links

 
 

Buses of Canada
Buses of the United States
Vehicles introduced in 1989